R67 may refer to:
 R67 (South Africa), a road
 BMW R67, a motorcycle
 , a destroyer of the Royal Navy
 R67: Vapours may cause drowsiness and dizziness, a risk phrase